Hossein Shams (born 6 April 1961) is an Iranian professional futsal coach and former footballer.

Honours

National team
 Champions, AFC Futsal Championship, 1999, 2000, 2007, 2008, 2010
 Champions, Confederations Cup, 2009
 Runners-up, Grand Prix de Futsal, 2007, 2009

Individual
Best National Team Coach of the World (Dimitri Nicolaou Award): 2009

References

2000 World Cup official report

1961 births
Living people
People from Saveh
Iranian football managers
Iranian futsal coaches
Elmo Adab FSC managers
Iran national futsal team managers
Giti Pasand FSC managers